Atlantis Sky Patrol is a tile-matching puzzle video game developed by the team formerly known as Funpause, now part of Big Fish Studios, and distributed by Big Fish Games. The game is a sequel to 2005's Atlantis.

Plot 
In an alternative, retro-futuristic in the early 20th century, the player takes the role of the leader of the Sky Patrol, a secretive air patrol that takes on world threats. As the game begins, strange doomsday devices have been reportedly seen all across the world. Believed to originate from the long-lost continent of Atlantis, possibly as retaliation from looting its treasure in the first game, the player must disable all of them to save the world.

References

2006 video games
Windows games
Video games developed in France
MacOS games
IOS games
Tile-matching video games
Big Fish Games games